Ali was the cousin and son-in-law of the Islamic prophet Muhammad, and a member of the Ahl al-Bayt. According to Shias, Ali was the first Imam who is believed to be the rightful successor to Muhammad, divinely appointed successors of Muhammad who are claimed by the Shias. Although Ali was regarded, during the lifetime of Muhammad, as his initial successor, it would be 25 years before he was recognized with the title of Caliph (successor). According to the status of Ali (AS) it is believed he is infallible and sinless and is one of The Fourteen Infallibles of the household of Muhammed.

Tradition states that Ali was born inside the Kaaba in Mecca, and was a member of the Quraysh tribe. Ali's father and Muhammad's uncle, Abu Talib ibn ‘Abd al-Muttalib, was custodian of the Kaaba and a sheikh of the Banu Hashim, an important branch of the powerful tribe of the Quraysh. His mother, Fatimah bint Asad, was also from the Banu Hashim. In Arab culture it was a great honor for Ali that both of his parents belonged to the Banu Hashim. Ali was also one of descendants of Ishmael (Isma'il) the son of Abraham (Ibrahim).

During his childhood, Ali spent his first six years under his father's roof. Then, as a result of famine in and around Mecca, Muhammad asked his uncle, Abu Talib, to allow Ali to come and live in the house of his cousin. It would be another four years until Muhammad would announce his Prophethood. When the divine command came for Muhammad to begin to preach, Ali, only a child of ten years, was the first male to publicly announce his support for his cousin. Over the coming years, Ali stood firmly in his support of Muhammad during the persecution of Muslims by the Meccans.

Ali migrated to Medina shortly after Muhammad. There Muhammad told Ali that he had been ordered by God to give his daughter, Fatimah, to Ali in marriage. For the ten years that Muhammad led the community in Medina, Ali was extremely active in his service, leading parties of warriors on raids, and carrying messages and orders. With the exception of the Battle of Tabouk, Ali took part in all the battles fought for Islam during this time.

After the assassination of the third Caliph, Uthman ibn Affan, the Sahabah (companions of Muhammad) in Medina selected Ali to be the new Caliph. He encountered defiance and civil war (First Fitna) during his reign. Tragically, while Ali was praying on 19 Ramadan, during the first Rak'a of Nafilat al Fajr, while bowing to God in the Great Mosque of Kufa, Abd-al-Rahman ibn Muljam, a Kharijite assassin, struck him with a poison-coated sword. Ali died on the 21st of Ramadan in the city of Kufa in 661 CE. Ali is highly regarded for his knowledge, belief, honesty, devotion to Islam, loyalty to Muhammad, his equal treatment of all Muslims, and his generosity in forgiving his defeated enemies. In addition, he is respected as the rightful successor of Muhammad. Ali retains his stature as the foremost authority on the Tafsir (Quranic exegesis), Fiqh (Islamic jurisprudence) and religious thought.

The compilation of sermons, lectures, and quotations attributed to Ali are compiled in the form of several books. Nahj al-Balagha is the most revered of them. It is considered by historians and scholars to be an important work in Islamic literature.

Early life
Fatimah bint Asad, the wife of Abu Talib ibn ‘Abd al-Muttalib, pregnant with Ali, completed her pregnancy term of 270 days but had not yet been induced into labor to give birth to the post-term baby. Abu Talib suggested to his wife that she perform circumambulations around the Kaaba and pray for divine assistance. In the midst of performing her rounds, she went into labor; at one corner of the Kaaba, designated as the Rukne Yamani, the Kaaba split open and she was given a push from behind towards the direction of the opening.

Inside the Kaaba, Fatimah gave birth to Ali, and it wasn't until Muhammad had looked upon the infant that the infant's eyelids opened. At the time of Ali's birth a special relationship was hence imparted between Muhammad and Ali, and would be manifested from the time of the Muhammad's call in the year 610 A.D. until his death in the year 632. Ali would be given the privilege of being to only person to be born inside the Kaaba.

In a Muslim tradition regarded as authentic by Shias and included in Mawaddat al-Qurba and Peshawar Nights, Ali's mother Fatimah bint Asad named him after her father, Asad. Abu Talib did not agree with her and said:

The answer to the prayer was Ali, derived from one of 99 Names of God, Al Ali (The Exalted).

Upbringing
When Ali was about six years of age, Muhammad was granted permission from his uncle Abu Talib to bring him up as his own child. For ten years, Ali stayed in Muhammad's care and became inseparable, taking on the character of Muhammad, going so far as to state;

He also says in a sermon,

Muhammad's era

Ali was the first child to declare in public his belief in Muhammad, and his message of Islam. His announcement came with Muhammad's first speech, directed to his family, about his divinely appointed mission. Tradition states that when the verse "And admonish thy nearest kinsmen," was revealed to Muhammad, he called Ali and said to him,

Once Muhammad had gathered the members of Banu Abd al-Muttalib he spoke to them, saying,

They all held back from the words of Muhammad, and though Ali was the youngest, he replied,

Some Banu Abd al-Muttalib rose up laughing and saying to Ali's father, Abu Talib,

The above hadith is however disputed and deemed weak according to Sunni hadith scientists due to who they deem as untrustworthy narrators in the chain.

Marriage with Fatimah
The Shia believe that the decision of Ali to marry Fatimah was a perfect union decreed by God in the seventh heaven and given to the angel Gabriel (Jibral) to transmit directly to Ali. It is also believed, that due to their sinless and infallible nature, there were never any arguments or differences between Ali and Fatimah, and believe that Ali never sought the hand of Amr ibn Hishām daughter in marriage, as that would, by definition make him fallible, as asking for the hand of marriage to an idol worshipper is a sin. They also believe that Muhammad did not grant him the title Abu Turab in displeasure, but rather from his delight at the battle of al-Ashira.

Boycott of Banu Hashim
Muhammad's denunciation of the Meccan traditional religion was especially offensive to his own tribe, the Quraysh, as they were the guardians of the Kaaba. So they persecuted the Muslims. According to the tradition, the leaders of the Banu Makhzum and Banu Abd-Shams, two important clans of the Quraysh, declared a public boycott against the clan of Banu Hashim, their commercial rival in order to put pressure on the clan.

At this time, Muhammad arranged for some of his followers to emigrate to Ethiopia. The boycott lasted for three years. Ali stood firmly in support of Muhammad during the years of persecution of Muslims and the boycott of Banu Hashim in Mecca.

Migration to Medina

In 622 CE, the year of Muhammad's migration to Yathrib (now Medina), Ali risked his life by sleeping in Muhammad's bed to impersonate him and thwart an assassination plot, so that Muhammad could escape in safety.
This night is called "Laylat Al-mabit". According to some hadith a verse was revealed about Ali concerning his sacrifice on the night of hijrah which says "And there is the type of man who gives his life to earn the pleasure of Allah"

Ali survived the plot, but risked his life again by staying in Mecca to carry out Muhammad's instructions: to restore to their owners all the goods and properties that had been entrusted to Muhammad for safekeeping. Then he went to Medina with Fatimah bint Asad (his mother), Fatimah (the daughter of Muhammad), and two other women.

Then Muhammad went on his final pilgrimage (Hajj) and when returning, he called all those who were ahead to come back and those who were behind to come ahead. They had stopped at a place called Khumm. Muhammad sat on a pulpit made of saddles. Hadith then records that he said, "Whoever's mawla I am, Ali is also his mawla". Shia take this word in its sense as "master", while Sunnis consider it to have meant "friend".

Succession to Muhammad
After uniting the Arabian tribes into a single Muslim religious polity in the last years of his life, Muhammad's death in 632 signalled disagreement over who would succeed him as leader of the Muslim community and a sudden panic overcame the many tribes within the Arabian Peninsula. The question of succession as to who would receive the caliphate arose. Though it was well known through many traditions related by Muhammad and in the Quran as to who was to succeed Muhammad (Ali), a small number of prominent companions took to the "Saqifah Banu Sa'ida" or Saqifah, a roofed building used by the tribe of Sa'ida, in the city of Medina, to decide amongst themselves as to who was going to lead the Muslims. Such companions as Abu Bakr, Umar ibn al-Khattab, and Sa'd ibn Ubadah, who was killed later, were present. The small secret band of companions exchanged arguments until the majority gave their bay'at (allegiance) to Abu Bakr.

While Ali and the rest of Muhammad's close family were washing his body for burial, at a gathering attended by a small group of Muslims at Saqifah, a close companion of Muhammad named Abu Bakr was nominated for the leadership of the community. Others added their support and Abu Bakr was made the first caliph. The choice of Abu Bakr disputed by some of Muhammad's companions, who held that Ali had been designated his successor by Muhammad himself.

Later When Fatimah and Ali sought aid from the companions in the matter of his right to the caliphate, they answered, "O daughter of the Messenger of God! We have given our allegiance to Abu Bakr. If Ali had come to us before this, we would certainly not have abandoned him. Ali said, 'Was it fitting that we should wrangle over the caliphate even before the Prophet was buried?'"

Following his election to the caliphate, Abu Bakr and Umar with a few other companions headed to Fatimah's house to force Ali and his supporters who had gathered there give their allegiance to Abu Bakr. Then, it is alleged that Umar threatened to set the house on fire unless they came out and swore allegiance with Abu Bakr. Then Umar set the house on fire and pushed the burnt door on Fatimah, who was pregnant at the time causing her to miscarry. Some sources say upon seeing them, Ali came out but was put in chains by Umar and his companions (Khalid Ibn Walid). Fatimah, in support of her husband, started a commotion and threatened to "uncover her hair", at which Abu Bakr relented and withdrew. Ali is reported to have repeatedly said that had there been forty men with him he would have resisted. When Abu Bakr's selection to the caliphate was presented as a fait accompli, Ali withheld his oaths of allegiance until after the death of Fatimah. Ali did not actively assert his own right because he did not want to throw the nascent Muslim community into strife.

Fatimah had asked Ali not to allow the caliphate or any of his followers to join in her burial. Two to three months after her father's death Fatimah herself died. As Ali was readying her body for burial he felt her broken ribs (done when she was wounded by Umar and those who tried to take her house) and started crying. At night Ali took her body for burial. The next day the Caliph and his followers wanted to disinter her body to pray over it, but Ali did not allow this.

This contentious issue caused Muslims to later split into two groups, Sunni and Shia. Shias believe that Muhammad explicitly named Ali as his successor at Ghadir Khumm and Muslim leadership belonged to him which had been determined by divine order.

The two groups also disagree on Ali's attitude towards Abu Bakr, and the two caliphs who succeeded him: Umar and Uthman Ibn Affan. Sunnis tend to stress Ali's acceptance and support of their rule, while the Shia claim that he distanced himself from them, and that he was being kept from fulfilling the religious duty that Muhammad had assigned to him. Sunnis maintain that if Ali was the rightful successor as ordained by God Himself, then it would have been his duty as leader of the Muslim nation to make war with these people (Abu Bakr, Umar and Uthman) until Ali established the decree. Shias contend that Ali did not fight Abu Bakr, Umar or Uthman, because he did not have the military strength and, if he had decided to, it would have caused a civil war amongst the Muslims. Ali also believed that he could fulfil his role of Imam'ate without fighting.

Ali himself was firmly convinced of his legitimacy for caliphate based on his close kinship with Muhammad, his intimate association and his knowledge of Islam and his merits in serving its cause. He told Abu Bakr that his delay in pledging allegiance (bay'ah) as caliph was based on his belief of his own prior title. Ali did not change his mind when he finally pledged allegiance to Abu Bakr and then to Umar and to Uthman but had done so for the sake of the unity of Islam, at a time when it was clear that the Muslims had turned away from him.

According to Shia historical reports, Ali maintained his right to the caliphate and said:

Abu Bakr's era

In Shia view, Imam Ali never fought in the Ridda wars which were prompted because the Muslims defied the Caliphate of Abu Bakr by not paying taxes. After all, his Caliphate was decided by a few in Saqifah in the absence of major political figures, such as Imam Ali ibn Abu Talib who was busy with the funeral services and burial of Mohammad.

In Sahih Bukahri, the daughter of Abu Bakr, 'Aisha narrates,

 
The narration also gives the reason for this anger: Abu Bakr refused to give Lady Fatima bint Mohammad her inheritance. The matter was put on trial where Abu Bakr was the judge. In the trial she gives her famous sermon wherein she asserts her own rights to Fadak, and the rights of her husband, Imam Ali ibn Abu Talib, as successor to her father. Part of the sermon in which the Lady of Light, Fatima Zahra, addresses the masses in Al-Masjid an-Nabawi, the site of the trial, she says,

Decades later when Imam Ali sits as Caliph, historians find that he mentions in a letter to his governor, Uthman bin Hunayf, that his family was deprived of Fadak, their only personal property, and they had to bear it patiently and cheerfully, and that the best Judge is Allah.

This trial is after Imam Ali's house is burned down (see Umar at Fatimah's house) in which his wife, Fatima bint Mohammad, sustains injuries causing her miscarriage and her eventual death. Abu Bakr had dispatched his nominator, Umar, to have Imam Ali swear the oath of allegiance but, Lady Fatima would not let him through the door so he forces his way in. Imam Ali ibn Abu Talib was put in ropes and dragged by horses, as he recounts in a letter to Muawiyah I who persistently accused Imam Ali for the assassination of the third Caliph,

In light of all this, it is not logical, from Shia point of view, to believe that Imam Ali ibn Abu Talib gave the oath of allegiance to Abu Bakr, or any other Caliph, after the demise of his beloved wife, Lady Fatima- who indisputably did not approve of the Caliphate. Especially when there are so many sources which say the contrary, manifesting his displeasure, distress, and sorrow at people who did not give consideration to his rights stated in Ghadeer Khumm by the Holy Prophet, who was nearer to his family than anyone else, and the rights of the daughter of His Apostle.

Umar's era
Ali Asgher Razwy a 20th-century Shia Twelver scholar states:

Uthman's era

Shia Islam and Ali

Shia Islam holds that the Islamic Prophet Muhammad designated Ali ibn Abi Talib as his successor and the Imam (leader) after him, most notably at the event of Ghadir Khumm, but was prevented from the caliphate as a result of the incident of Saqifah. This view primarily contrasts with that of Sunni Islam, whose adherents believe that Muhammad did not appoint a successor and consider Abu Bakr, who they claim was appointed caliph by a small group of Muslims at Saqifah, to be the first rightful caliph after the Prophet. Unlike the first three Rashidun caliphs, Ali was from the same clan as Muhammad, Banu Hashim, as well as being the prophet's cousin, son in law and being the first male to become Muslim. Shia Islam is the second largest branch of Islam: as of the late 2000s, Shia Muslims constituted 10–15% of all Muslims. Twelver Shia (Ithnā'ashariyyah) is the largest branch of Shia Islam, with 2012 estimates saying that 85% of Shias were Twelvers.

Isma'ili view

The Gupti Ismaili community also holds that Imam ‘Ali and his descendants through Isma’il b. Ja’far, collectively, are the tenth and final avatāra expected by several South Asian religions, and represent the continuity of divine guidance to humankind. In the view of some Guptis, this is corroborated by the Quranic verse 14:4 which mentions the idea that God had sent a messenger to every land. They understand the avatāras to be these messengers sent by God to their people in the Indian Subcontinent.

The important Ismaili ginān Caution for the Faithful (Moman Chetāmaṇī), a foundational piece of literature for the Guptis of Bhavnagar and composed by Imamshah, alludes to the status of avatāra held by ‘Ali:“The descendants of ‘Ali and the Prophet continued

Generation upon generation

He who forsakes his veneration to them

Approaches the gates of Hell

Know that he will be considered the worst of the damned

The vision of whose face will be a heinous sin

A soul who shall destroy his own mother and father

A soul that does not recognize the present garb of the avatāra.”

Etiquette
When the Shia refer to Ali, they normally add "peace be upon him" ("‘alayhis salām") after it. Alternatively, the phrase "Allah has honoured his face" ("karram-allāhu wajhahu") is also used after his name, in reference to the Shia belief that Ali converted to Islam before the prophet was sent the message and never joined in any idol worship of the traditional Meccan gods. His face, they say, was never defiled by prostrations before the idols.

Famous Hadith used by the Shia

 Hadith of the pond of Khumm
 Hadith of the two weighty things
 Hadith of the Ark
 Hadith of truth
 Hadith of position
 Hadith of the dinner invitation
 Hadith of the Twelve Successors
 Hadith of the Imam of Time
 Hadith of Mubahala
 Hadith of the Cloak

Works
Shia say that Ali is the source of the following:
 the Quran, see Shia view of the Quran
 Al-Jafr: compiled by Ali from Muhammad.
 Al-Jamia: compiled by Ali from Muhammad.
 Nahj al-Balagha
 Du'a Kumayl

See also
 Outline of Islam
 Glossary of Islam
 Index of Islam-related articles
 Family tree of Ali
 Sunni view of Ali
 Shia view of Umar
 Umayyad tradition of cursing Ali
 Ghurabiyya Shia, 
 Islamic Unity week

References

External links
 Imam Ali biography in English
 The Sayings and Wisdom of Imam 'Ali
 Website devoted to the Life of Imam Ali ibn Abi Talib
 Sayings of Imam Ali ibn Abi Talib
 Imam Ali foundation
 Imam Ali ibn Abi Talib Nahjul Balagha
 Imam Ali ibn Abi Talib's status

Ali
Ismailism
Ali